Boreham is a village and civil parish in Essex, England.

Boreham may also refer to:

Places in England
 Boreham, Wiltshire, an area of Warminster
 Boreham Circuit, a disused motor racing circuit in Essex
 Boreham Street, West Sussex, a village

People with the surname
 Chloe Boreham (born 1986), Franco-Australian actress
 Colin Boreham (born 1954), British athlete
 Craig Boreham, Australian film director, producer, and writer.
 Frank W. Boreham (1871–1959), English Baptist minister, worked in New Zealand and Australia
 Fred Boreham (1885–1951), English footballer
 Frederick Boreham (1888–1966), Archdeacon of Cornwall and Chaplain to Queen Elizabeth II
 Jamie Boreham (born 1978), Canadian footballer and coach
 John Boreham (1925–1994), British government statistician
 Leslie Boreham (1918–2004), English barrister and judge
 Puakena Boreham (born 1970), Tuvaluan politician
 Stephen Boreham (1857–1925), New Zealand shearer and trade unionist

See also
 Borehamwood, Hertfordshire, England